Florence Campbell may refer to:

 The maiden name of Florence Bravo, wife of murder victim Charles Bravo
 A fictional character played by Lynne Moody in ABC daytime drama series General Hospital